The CBS Television Network is an American television network made up of 15 owned-and-operated stations and nearly 228 affiliates. Stations are listed in alphabetical order by city of license.

 (**) – Indicates station was built and signed on by CBS.

Owned-and-operated stations

Affiliate stations

U.S. territories

Outside the U.S.

See also
Lists of ABC television affiliates
Lists of NBC television affiliates
Lists of CBS television affiliates

Notes

License ownership/operational agreements

Previous CBS affiliations

Satellites and semi-satellites

References 

CBS